Dysectopa scalifera is a moth of the family Gracillariidae. It is known from Namibia.

References

Endemic fauna of Namibia
Gracillariinae
Insects of Namibia
Moths of Africa